Gostatin is an irreversible inhibitor of the aspartate aminotransferase produced by the bacterium Streptomyces sumanensis. Its structure is a dihydro-4-pyridone analog of glutamic acid.

References

Further reading 

 

Gostatin
Amino acids
Secondary amino acids
Dicarboxylic acids